The Diocese of Moray, Ross and Caithness is one of the seven dioceses of the Scottish Episcopal Church. It covers Caithness and Sutherland (the old Diocese of Caithness), mainland Ross and Cromarty (the old Diocese of Ross), and mainland Inverness-shire, Nairnshire, Moray and Banffshire (the old Diocese of Moray). The diocesan centre is St Andrew's Cathedral in Inverness.  The see is currently occupied by Mark Strange.

History
The three old dioceses united in the modern diocese were all founded during the 12th century. Moray was founded by Gregory in 1114, Ross by Macbeth in 1131 and Caithness by Aindréas of Caithness in 1146. Being more removed from the centre of political power during the Scottish Reformation, each of the dioceses managed to continue an unbroken line of bishops. However, its remoteness also caused problems for the appointment of new bishops under the period of the penal laws. For part of the 17th century, both Ross and Caithness were without a bishop, and, at the beginning of the 18th century, the Diocese of Orkney was united with Caithness. In 1707, Alexander Rose, Bishop of Edinburgh and the first Primus, united Moray with his diocese for reason of practical oversight. John Fullarton, Rose's successor in both roles, continued to oversee Moray until 1725, when it was felt more practical to combine it with the Diocese of Aberdeen, led by James Gadderar. However, in 1727, the new Primus, Andrew Lumsden, appointed William Dunbar as sole Bishop of Moray and Ross, combining the vacant northern see with Moray. In 1777, William Falconar, also Primus, united Orkney, Moray, Ross and Caithness under his rule. In 1819, David Low was appointed Bishop of Ross by itself, but, from 1838 he administered the entire former union and the see officially returned to the union in 1851. In 1857, Orkney was separated to unite with the Diocese of Aberdeen. Mark Strange was elected as the new bishop on 2 June 2007 and was consecrated and installed on 13 October 2007. In 2020, Synod Clerk Rev Canon Michael Last reported an increase in membership and in number of communicants.

Area and population 
The diocese covers the historic counties of Caithness (population 26,500), Sutherland (population 13,000), mainland Ross and Cromarty (population 57,500), Inverness-shire except the Hebridean parts and Lochaber (population 88,500), Nairnshire (population 12,500), Morayshire (population 68,000), the Dufftown, Keith and Aberchirder areas of Banffshire (population 16,500), and the Huntly area of Aberdeenshire (population 8,000).

This total population of approximately 290,500 gives the diocese a ratio of one priest to every 18,200 inhabitants and one church to every 7,300 inhabitants.

List of churches 
The diocese currently has 16 stipendiary clergy and 40 church buildings.

See also
 Bishop of Moray, Ross and Caithness

References

External links
 The Diocese of Moray, Ross and Caithness 

 
Moray, Ross and Caithness
Religion in Inverness
1857 establishments in Scotland